Albayrak Group is a Turkish multinational conglomerate company based in Istanbul, Turkey. For the first three decades it was a construction company, but since 1982 it has expanded into other sectors, including transport and logistics, waste management, and media. It acquired the Yeni Şafak newspaper in 1997.

The group has been contracted by the government multiple times because of its close ties with AK Parti. It is also active internationally and has done construction of Lahore Metro Bus and is currently managing Mogadishu Port in Somalia and Conakry port in Guinea.

History 
The company was founded in 1952 by Ahmet Albayrak, and until his death in 2010 was run by him and his six sons. Nuri Albayrak was a partner at Yeni Şafak until he became President of Trabzonspor. Mustafa Albayrak is Yeni Şafak'''s CEO.

The shareholders of company include Ahmet Albayrak, Nuri Albayrak, Bayram Albayrak, Kazım Albayrak, Muzaffer Albayrak, and Mustafa Albayrak.

 Subsidiaries 

 Albayrak Media Group 

 Newspaper 
 Yeni Şafak''

Television channels 
 TVNET
 Show TV

Online outlets 
 yenisafak.com
 GZT (YouTube)

References

External links

Conglomerate companies of Turkey
Companies based in Istanbul
Holding companies established in 1952
Holding companies of Turkey
Turkish companies established in 1952
Multinational companies headquartered in Turkey